

Media Research Information Bureau charts
 List of UK Dance Singles Chart number ones of 1987
 List of UK Dance Singles Chart number ones of 1988

See also
 Lists of UK Singles Chart number ones
 Lists of UK Dance Albums Chart number ones
 Lists of UK Independent Singles Chart number ones
 Lists of UK R&B Singles Chart number ones
 Lists of UK Rock & Metal Singles Chart number ones
 Lists of UK Singles Downloads Chart number ones

External links
Dance Singles Chart at the Official Charts Company
UK Top 40 Dance Singles at BBC Radio 1

Electronic dance music